The Victorian Order of Nurses (VON) has been leading home and community care in Canada for over a century. Today, VON provides home and community support services to over 10,000 people every day across Ontario and Nova Scotia. It is registered as a charity with the Canada Revenue Agency, under charity number 129482493RR0001. Since 2014, the President and CEO is Jo-Anne Poirier.

History

Lady Aberdeen, wife of Canadian Governor General Lord Aberdeen, visited Vancouver, British Columbia, in 1896. While there, she heard many stories of women and children alone in remote areas of Canada as their husbands had to travel great distances for medical help. At a meeting of the National Council for Women in Halifax, Nova Scotia, she was asked to create an order of visiting nurses in Canada. It was to be a memorial for the 60th anniversary of Queen Victoria's ascent to the throne of the British Empire. At Rideau Hall on February 10, 1897, Prime Minister Sir Wilfrid Laurier hosted an inauguration to create the Victorian Order of Nurses "as a mode of commemoration by the Dominion of Canada (Canada) of the Queen's Diamond Jubilee". In 1898, the first nurse training program was established for the Victorian Order of Nurses in Ottawa, Ontario.

In 1898, one of the first high-profile projects for the VON was a call to women to join the Victorian Order of Nurses' Klondike contingent. Candidates had to be unmarried, at least twenty-eight years old, and be a graduate of a recognized nursing school. They were warned they would have to dress very plainly and not curl or crimp their hair. Four nurses were selected, three Canadians and one recent immigrant from England. They reached Dawson one month after the Sisters of Saint Anne and found their skills desperately needed to care for the many victims of the typhoid epidemic that was raging through the Klondike.

The VON has helped Canada through many incidents including World War I, the Halifax Explosion and World War II. More importantly, VON has been an important element of building community, creating opportunities for people to work together to meet their needs and those of their friends and neighbours.

VON Canada is structured into a national service provider and local charities. Both are governed by volunteer Board members. The National Board is composed of dedicated volunteers from across Canada elected by the representatives of the local branches. The local branches operate in each of their communities, raising funds and lobbying to meet specific needs.

On November 25, 2015, VON suddenly shut down all their operations outside of Ontario and Nova Scotia. The order was lacking in funding, and could no longer support operating offices in other areas. It will restructure to determine what services will continue to be offered while being financially viable.

Today, with a staff of 6,000 and as many volunteers, VON provides home and community support services to over 10,000 people every day across Ontario and Nova Scotia.

See also
 Elizabeth Lawrie Smellie
 Queen's Nursing Institute, England, Wales, and Northern Ireland
 James Thorburn (Canadian physician)

References

External links

 

1897 establishments in Ontario
Charities based in Canada
Nursing organizations in Canada
Organizations established in 1897
Organizations based in Ottawa